FC Borysfen Boryspil is a formerly professional Ukrainian football club from Boryspil, Ukraine. The club was created as a phoenix club in 1997 by Ihor Kovalevych after disagreement in FC CSKA Kyiv (today FC Arsenal Kyiv). The history of the club is controversial and its admission to professional competitions is dubious. In mid 1990s the original team of Zlobenko reached some agreement with the Central Sports Club of the Armed Forces of Ukraine (CSK ZSU) after which there was established a joint team "CSKA-Borysfen" that became the first successful debutant of the Ukrainian Vyshcha Liha (today Ukrainian Premier League) finishing among top 5 at the end of season. Following that season the newly created Professional Football League for unknown reason decided to dissolve the joint venture and recognize ownership of the club after company "Kyiv-Donbass" that was associated with the Ministry of Defense. 

The original owner Zlobenko gave up, while his partner Kovalevych decided to "revenge the injustice" and in 1997 re-established new club in Boryspil with a promise to advance to the top league again. Kovalevych kept his promise, but after couple of seasons the club was relegated from premiers and later went bankrupt.

The club was re-founded in 2013 after bankruptcy in 2007, joining the local amateur league with a view to return to professional football.

Overview

Nyva-Borysfen, FC Boryspil, and CSKA-Borysfen (before 1997)

Foundation and joining Nyva Myronivka
The club takes its roots from the appearance of FC Boryspil and that fact is well documented. FC Boryspil was established on 9 March 1993 by Ukrainian geologist and entrepreneur Dmytro Zlobenko (1961-2013) along with his partner Ihor Kovalevych and his science production firm "Geoton". Zlobenko managed to find ways in cooperation with local administrations of Myronivka and Boryspil raions  (districts  in the southeastern part of Kyiv Oblast). With the ongoing season, the club merged with the already existing FC Nyva Myronivka that competed at the Ukrainian Transition League (at that time was considered to have semi-professional status) and took over their brand temporary renaming into Nyva-Borysfen, while the original Nyva restarted as FC Nyva Karapyshi in the Kyiv Oblast Championship. The idea of club's organization, in the beginning, came from another former football player and coach from Kyiv, Ivan Terletskyi who also offered to seek help from Mikhail Oshenkov, a son of Oleg Oshenkov and  worked closely with Valeriy Lobanovskyi. Among other people who were involved in creation of the new club were children coach out of Kuchakiv, Viktor Haiduk, director of the local "Kolos" sports society Mykola Kostianets, head of the Boryspil Raion state administration, Mykhailo Muzyka, and Boryspil mayor, Oleksandr Prydatko.

The original coach Volodymyr Kolomiets was left managing the club. Some new players were brought to the squad like Igoris Pankratjevas from FC Dynamo Kyiv and Oleksandr Ivanov from FC Metalist Kharkiv. With the help of Anatoliy Kroshchenko (at that time coached FC Dynamo-3 Kyiv), Nyva-Borysfen's squad was increased with Dynamo Kyiv's young footballers. The same year (1993) Nyva-Borysfen won the Kyiv Oblast Cup, in order to participate in the Ukrainian Cup competitions. The new Nyva-Borysfen started out with a home loss to FC Naftokhimik Kremenchuk, while its next game it surprisingly won away in Kerch against the local FC Voikovets. The first recorded game of the merged club took place on 3 April 1993 (the date when the second half of the season restarted).
   
Fielded squad: Ruslan Novikov, Serhiy Kalian, Serhiy Yaroshenko, Vyacheslav Nivinskyi, Oleksandr Otlyotov, Andriy Mikhno, Yuriy Hetman (Kostiantyn Chupys, 40; Oleh Balyuk, 80), Ihor Symonenko, Serhiy Hura (Mykhailo Bezruchko, 55) Yuriy Zhabynskyi, Oleg Solovyov. Coach – Volodymyr Kolomiets.
   
At the same time in Boryspil started out reconstruction of Kolos Stadium. Already since 15 May 1993, Nyva-Borysfen played its home games at the CSK ZSU Stadium. Nonetheless, the team failed its goals placing just outside the promotion zone in a tournament table. Luckily, the FFU Executive Committee decided to expand leagues and the "Myronivka Boryspilians" obtained the opportunity to jump on a last train car of the amateur "train" that was moving towards the official professional competitions, while heading back there was a more sad "train" that carried to the Transition League relegated from the last place FC CSK ZSU Kyiv. During the inter-seasonal break there were almost no changes made to the club's squad and coaching staff, except for a few players who went on to play for Borysfen Boryspil.

Sponsorship of the Football Federation of Ukraine
Since 1993, Dmytro Zlobenko provided funding for still developing and young Football Federation of Ukraine (FFU). He sponsored various FFU projects, tours and travels of its teams. The amount of financial support was over $500,000. The club administration managed to find a common ground with Yevhen Kotelnykov who at that time was the first vice-president of the Football Federation of Ukraine and played a key role in Ukrainian football. At the club presentation that took place in Kyiv was present Anatoliy Konkov who then administered the Ukrainian amateur football.
   
Among main sponsored events were an international tournament in Spain for Volodymyr Muntyan U-21 team and a tour of the Ukraine national football team (coached by Oleh Bazylevych) to the United States. Later the club's administration helped the Volodymyr Kyianenko U-16 team (predecessor of Ukraine U-17 team) with a travel to the 1994 UEFA European Under-16 Championship where it placed third. Cooperation with the Muntyan's youth team gave certain preferences in signing several better players among which were Hennadiy Moroz and Vitaliy Pushkutsa. The latter was targeted by Dynamo Kyiv and was signed just before Dynamo came with its offer. Alas, a signing of Vitaliy Kosovskyi did not materialized as Dynamo was faster in signing him, also fell through a transfer of Oleh Luzhnyi.
   
In 1993, the club among the first in Ukraine built its football stadium in Boryspil (Kolos Stadium) on the funds of private investors. It was completely demolished and built anew in three months. It was completed just before the game for Ukrainian Cup against Dynamo during the 1993-94 season. During the stadium's reconstruction, Borysfen played at a high school stadium in Shchaslyve.

Second League and Borysfen Boryspil
Before the 1993–94 season in the Second League, the place of newly promoted Nyva-Borysfen was de facto handed over to the newly established FC Borysfen Boryspil, while Nyva that restarted as FC Nyva Karapyshi was reinstated as Nyva Myronivka in the Transitional League (Perekhidna Liha). The promoted Borysfen Boryspil managed to secure head coach services of Viktor Kolotov who along with Anatoliy Demyanenko joined the club coming from CSK ZSU Kyiv. During the summer interseason the new club was conducting tryouts for several players who previously played for FC Dynamo-2 Kyiv or were affiliated with Dynamo Kyiv football school system. Among those players it is worth to mention such as Oleksandr Shovkovskyi, Vladyslav Vashchuk, Ihor Fedorov, Oleksandr Venhlinskyi, Viktor Belkin, Mykola Volosyanko. In the preseason FC Borysfen signed several other important players such as Stepan Matviyiv (top scorer of 1992-93 season). Also while looking after a new club during the summer interseason, the Soviet international player Hennadiy Litovchenko played few friendlies on the team, but later stayed in the club.
   
FC Borysfen Boryspil became the first Ukrainian club out of Druha Liha that spent its inter-seasonal break abroad in the German neighborhood Ruit (part of Ostfildern, near Stuttgart) which was favorite spot of FC Dynamo Kyiv and Valeriy Lobanovskyi, in particular and Graz in Austria.
   
Its first game at professional level the club played on 17 August 1993 in Kerch against the local Voikovets tying it at 2.
   
Fielded squad: Oleksandr Filipchenko – Ihor Fedorov, Dmytro Koryenyev, Mykola Volosyanko, Dmytro Semchuk – Vladimir Matsigura, Oleksandr Venhlinskyi (Oleh Sukhomlynov), Pavlo Nesterchuk, Viktor Byelkin (Mykhailo Bezruchko) – Oleg Solovyov, Serhiy Kovalyov (Oleksandr Ivanov). Coach – Viktor Kolotov.
   
In the 1993–94 Ukrainian Cup, the club passed two rounds beating such clubs like FC Khimik Zhytomyr and FC Nyva Karapyshi (predecessor of the revived Nyva Myronivka), but was eliminated in the round of 32 losing both games of two legs play-off against FC Dynamo Kyiv.
   
During the first half the Kolotov's team nine times tied losing points with not very strong opponents. Although in main games were obtained decisive home victories, and succeeded in tying with strong Naftokhimik in Kremenchuk, in a spring Borysfen changed a head coach, its squad and the club's name. After the first half Borysfen was leading with closest pursuer FC Yavir Krasnopillia trailing by a point. At the end of 1993 FC Borysfen was negotiating with Valeriy Lobanovskyi who had his contract expired with United Arab Emirates (UAE national football team). After three days of negotiations, Lobanovskyi signed a contract with the Kuwait national football team. The club changed its name to FC Boryspil during the winter break. The new head coach was appointed Volodymyr Bezsonov who also was coaching CSK ZSU previously as Kolotov, leaving his armymen to Volodymyr Lozynskyi. His assistant became Volodymyr Muntyan. During midseason the club lost Litovchenko who left for Admira Wacker. During the winter break, the club again spent time abroad leaving twice to Slovakia and again to Ruit-Ostfildern in Germany. The club joined following debutants Hennadiy Moroz, Eduard Tsykhmeistruk, Vitaliy Pushkutsa, Ervand Sukiasian, Viktor Ulianytskyi, Oleksandr Lyubynskyi, Andriy Kyrlyk, Vitaliy Ponomarenko, Mykhailo Stelmakh. Started out a bit shy with draws in the rows, the club managed to gain the champion's stride with only one loss in the second half and winning early the Druha Liha (Second League).

First League and merger with CSKA
Successes of the Boryspil club have done their job and Borysfen, that before its debut in the 1994–95 Ukrainian First League (Persha Liha) returned its previous name, a priori was considered among the season's favorites. For the new season Bezsonov shuffled his coaching staff inviting Yevhen Lemeshko, Ivan Terletskyi, and Viktor Chanov. Beside having Viktor Chanov as a goalie coach, the new season Borysfen started out with such experienced goalies like Volodymyr Savchenko, Valeriy Vorobyov, Oleksandr Humenyuk, and Vadim Egoshkin. Also the club managed to secure services of the Ukraine's international Dmytro Topchiev. The season Borysfen started out well, but lost several important games including one in Kirovohrad (Kropyvnytskyi) against the local FC Zirka-NIBAS Kirovohrad. The culmination came in September when the club lost to FC Dynamo-2 Kyiv 0:4 with the first goal has been scored by the unknown at that time 17 year old Andriy Shevchenko. Following the loss, Zlobenko replaced Bezsonov with Mykhailo Fomenko who was about to sign a contract with the Guinea national football team and has won his first game with the team against Botswana at the 1996 African Cup of Nations qualification. At the winter break the club was placing third in the league.
   
In the 1994–95 Ukrainian Cup, the club again passed two rounds beating such clubs like FC Zmina-Obolon Kyiv and FC CSKA Kyiv (both playing away), but was eliminated in the round of 32 losing in two legs play-off against FC Veres Rivne.
   
At the same time FC CSKA Kyiv was playing at the 1994–95 Ukrainian Third League which was to be discontinued for the next seasons and most clubs would have been admitted to the Second League (Druha Liha). Before that CSKA played as CSK ZSU Kyiv in the 1992-93 Ukrainian Second League and was relegated. Led by Volodymyr Lozynskyi, FC CSKA Kyiv won the 1994–95 season in the Third League (Tretia Liha) gaining 101 season points and was to be promoted back to the Second League. Yet, the armymen wanted something more. During the 1994–95 winter break the Minister of Defense Valeriy Shmarov and Dmytro Zlobenko reached an agreement about uniting of efforts and creation of the club CSKA–Borysfen. At disposal of Boryspil partners there appeared a football "administrative resource" of the army allowing, for example, at once to "call" under the club's colours from FC Veres Rivne the most talented half-back Oleksandr Svystunov and the other side received financial rears that CSKA so lacked. The team had lived in a hotel on territory of the RUFK boarding school (today Piddubny Olympic College) where it had trained among other places such as CSKA Stadium and sometimes even Republican Stadium. At the same time the Ministry of Defense kept its original CSKA team as well that continued to play at the Second League.
   
The 1995 spring portion of the season CSKA–Borysfen started out under new name, being registered in the capital city, and notable reinforcement. To the team's games that played at the CSKA Stadium on Povitroflotskyi prospekt were drawn football fans as the team was composed out of legends of the Soviet football, merited masters of sport, and holders of many other whatnot titles. To its first spring game against Krystal from Chortkiv, the team consisted of following players Viktor Chanov, Oleh Kuznetsov, Yervand Sukiasyan, Mikheil Jishkariani, Andriy Annenkov, Vladyslav Prudius, Stepan Matviyiv, Mykola Volosyanko, Mykola Zakotyuk, Vitaliy Pushkutsa, and Oleh Pestryakov. The squad completely thrashed Krystal 5:0 and then seven games in a row went without a loss, stumbled two times in a row, and confidently finished the end of season. With help of Andrei Fedkov, the team managed to beat its main opponent of the season, FC Zirka Kirovohrad, finishing second after Zirka.

Own history
In 1997 a new club was reestablished under the name of FC Borysfen Borysfen and started at amateur level and soon was promoted to the Druha Liha. The club eventually won through to the Ukrainian Premier League, but by 2005 they finished in last position and were relegated back to the Persha Liha. In the 2005–06 and 2006–07 seasons played in the Ukrainian First League. In 2007, after the winter break, the club suffered financial difficulties, went into bankruptcy and folded.

Rebirth

In 2013 the club was reformed as a youth club that would participate in the Kyiv Oblast competition with the future goals of returning to the national competition.

Honors
Ukrainian Second League: 1
 1999-00
Ukrainian Second League Cup: 1
 1999-00

Runners-up

Ukrainian First League: 2
 2002–03

Ukrainian Second League: 2
 1998–99

Football kits and sponsors

League and cup history
{|class="wikitable"
|-bgcolor="#efefef"
! Season
! Div.
! Pos.
! Pl.
! W
! D
! L
! GS
! GA
! P
!Domestic Cup
!colspan=2|Europe
!Notes
|-bgcolor=PowderBlue
|align=center|1997–98
|align=center|3rd
|align=center|14
|align=center|34
|align=center|11
|align=center|7
|align=center|16
|align=center|38
|align=center|48
|align=center|40
|align=center|1/128 finals
|align=center|
|align=center|
|align=center|FC Borysfen Boryspil
|-bgcolor=PowderBlue
|align=center|1998–99
|align=center|3rd
|align=center bgcolor=silver|2
|align=center|28
|align=center|17
|align=center|7
|align=center|4
|align=center|37
|align=center|10
|align=center|58
|align=center|
|align=center|
|align=center|
|align=center|
|-bgcolor=PowderBlue
|align=center|1999-00
|align=center|3rd
|align=center bgcolor=gold|1
|align=center|26
|align=center|19
|align=center|3
|align=center|4
|align=center|57
|align=center|9
|align=center|60
|align=center|1/8 finals
|align=center|
|align=center|
|align=center bgcolor=green|Promoted
|-bgcolor=LightCyan
|align=center|2000–01
|align=center|2nd
|align=center|12
|align=center|34
|align=center|12
|align=center|7
|align=center|15
|align=center|28
|align=center|34
|align=center|43
|align=center|1/16 finals
|align=center|
|align=center|
|align=center|
|-bgcolor=LightCyan
|align=center|2001–02
|align=center|2nd
|align=center|13
|align=center|34
|align=center|10
|align=center|10
|align=center|14
|align=center|44
|align=center|47
|align=center|40
|align=center|1/16 finals
|align=center|
|align=center|
|align=center|
|-bgcolor=LightCyan
|align=center|2002–03
|align=center|2nd
|align=center bgcolor=silver|2
|align=center|34
|align=center|19
|align=center|9
|align=center|6
|align=center|44
|align=center|16
|align=center|66
|align=center|1/16 finals
|align=center|
|align=center|
|align=center bgcolor=green|Promoted
|-
|align=center|2003–04
|align=center|1st
|align=center|7
|align=center|30
|align=center|11
|align=center|8
|align=center|11
|align=center|25
|align=center|29
|align=center|41
|align=center|1/8 finals
|align=center|
|align=center|
|align=center|
|-
|align=center|2004–05
|align=center|1st
|align=center|16
|align=center|30
|align=center|3
|align=center|11
|align=center|16
|align=center|15
|align=center|31
|align=center|20
|align=center|1/16 finals
|align=center|
|align=center|
|align=center bgcolor=red|Relegated
|-bgcolor=LightCyan
|align=center|2005–06
|align=center|2nd
|align=center|16
|align=center|34
|align=center|3
|align=center|14
|align=center|17
|align=center|23
|align=center|46
|align=center|23
|align=center|1/32 finals
|align=center|
|align=center|
|align=center|
|-bgcolor=LightCyan
|align=center|2006–07
|align=center|2nd
|align=center|19
|align=center|36
|align=center|1
|align=center|4
|align=center|31
|align=center|10
|align=center|29
|align=center|1
|align=center|1/8 finals
|align=center|
|align=center|
|align=center bgcolor=red|Club is bankrupt and is dissolved after winter break
|}

See also
 FC CSCA Kyiv
 FC Nyva Myronivka
 FC Arsenal Kyiv
 FC Borysfen-2 Boryspil

References

Notes

External links
  Club statistics at KLISF
 1993 Season record
 Artur Valerko, Yuriy Malyshev. The 57 heroes of "Borysfen" (57 богатирів «Борисфена»). Ukrainian Association of Football. 4 July 2011
 The president of Borysfen has been prohibited to perform his functions (Президенту "Борисфена" запрещено исполнять свои функции). Football.ua. 9 December 2006

 
Defunct football clubs in Ukraine
Football clubs in Boryspil
Association football clubs established in 1993
1993 establishments in Ukraine
Association football clubs disestablished in 2007
2007 disestablishments in Ukraine